In mid-May 2021, A-76, was, before it broke into three, the world's largest floating iceberg, calved from the Filchner–Ronne Ice Shelf in Antarctica. 

The new iceberg, effectively a piece of floating ice shelf, detached from western side of the ice shelf. It floated through the Weddell Sea and by 2023 had reached the South Atlantic near South Georgia, carried by currents and winds. The size at calving was an estimated .

The new iceberg was first spotted by Keith Makinson, a polar oceanographer with the British Antarctic Survey in May 2021.

By day 148, the iceberg consisted of three fragments, A-76a, A-76b, and A-76c.

References

External links
  Scatterometer Climate Record Pathfinder Antarctic iceberg tracker

Filchner-Ronne Ice Shelf
A-76
Bodies of ice of Queen Elizabeth Land